Dean Farm is a historic farm complex and national historic district located near Louisburg, Franklin County, North Carolina.   The district encompasses two contributing buildings, one contributing site, and two contributing structures. The farmhouse was built about 1842, and is a two-story, three bay, Federal / Greek Revival style frame dwelling.  It has a gable roof and two large single-shoulder gable-end chimneys of large stone blocks.  Also on the property are the contributing smokehouse, corn crib, harness room, and family cemetery.

It was listed on the National Register of Historic Places in 1975.

References

Farms on the National Register of Historic Places in North Carolina
Historic districts on the National Register of Historic Places in North Carolina
Houses completed in 1842
Greek Revival houses in North Carolina
Federal architecture in North Carolina
Houses in Franklin County, North Carolina
National Register of Historic Places in Franklin County, North Carolina